Leucopogon insularis is a species of flowering plant in the heath family Ericaceae and is endemic to the south-west of Western Australia. It is a rigid, scrubby shrub with many branches, linear or oblong leaves and tube-shaped, white flowers.

Description
The flowers are borne singly or in pairs in leaf axils on a short peduncle with small bracts, and bracteoles less than half as long as the sepals.

Taxonomy and naming
Leucopogon insularis was first formally described in 1839 by Augustin Pyramus de Candolle in his Prodromus Systematis Naturalis Regni Vegetabilis, after an unpublished description by Allan Cunningham of specimens collected on Rottnest Island. The specific epithet (insularis) means "insular", referring the type location.

Distribution and habitat
This leucopogon grows in near-coastal areas of the Geraldton Sandplains and Swan Coastal Plain bioregions of south-western Western Australia.

Conservation status
Leucopogon insularis, as Styphelia insularis, is listed as "not threatened" by the Government of Western Australia Department of Biodiversity, Conservation and Attractions.

References

insularis
Ericales of Australia
Flora of Western Australia
Plants described in 1839
Taxa named by Augustin Pyramus de Candolle